Ormiston Maritime Academy (formerly known as Hereford Technology School) is a secondary school with academy status in Grimsby, North East Lincolnshire, England.

The school has an intake of 1048 pupils, aged 11 to 16.

In the last Ofsted report under its former name, Hereford Technology School, the school was found to have a larger proportion of pupils with disabilities or special learning requirements than is found on average nationally. The school has facilities to address these needs, and Extended Services for pupils and parents. The school gained specialist technology status in 2000, and moved into a new building in October 2010.

The school gained Academy status on 1 August 2011 when it became Ormiston Maritime Academy. It is sponsored by the Ormiston Academies Trust.

Notable alumni
Jane Andrews—murderer of Tom Cressman
Stuart Carrington—professional snooker player
Gary Lloyd—West End theatre director and choreographer
Danny North—footballer, formerly of Grimsby Town, subsequent League of Ireland and FAI Cup winner

References

External links
Ormiston Maritime Academy web site, Retrieved 19 January 2012

Academies in the Borough of North East Lincolnshire
Schools in Grimsby
Secondary schools in the Borough of North East Lincolnshire
Ormiston Academies